John Rozgonyi (? – 1471) was voivode of Transylvania in 1441–1458 and in 1459–1461 (for the second time), also ispán of Sopron and Vas Counties (1449–1454), count of the Székelys (1457–1458), Judge Royal of the Kingdom of Hungary. He was married to Orsolya Szilágyi from the House of Szilágyi, they had the following children: John, András, István, Apollónia (who married Benedek Csáky).

References

Sources
(Hungarian) Engel, Pál (1996). Magyarország világi archontológiája, 1301–1457, I. ("Secular Archontology of Hungary, 1301–1457, Volume I"). História, MTA Történettudományi Intézete. Budapest. .
(Hungarian) Markó, László (2000). A magyar állam főméltóságai Szent Istvántól napjainkig: Életrajzi Lexikon ("Great Officers of State in Hungary from King Saint Stephen to Our Days: A Biographical Encyclopedia"). Magyar Könyvklub. 
Engel, Pál (2001). The Realm of St Stephen: A History of Medieval Hungary, 895–1526. I.B. Tauris Publishers. .

1471 deaths
Judges royal
Voivodes of Transylvania
Counts of the Székelys
John